Two Women Bathing was a 1763 painting by Joseph-Marie Vien. A copy of it is now in the Musée de Cahors Henri-Martin in Cahors. The original was commissioned by Louis Philippe I, Duke of Orleans and first exhibited at the 1763 Salon.

Sources
Catalogue du musée de Cahors, La commission d’organisation du musée, 1883, p. 9-12, Lagrenée- Femme au bain.

1763 paintings
Paintings by Joseph-Marie Vien
Bathing in art